Arcturus is a star.

Arcturus may also refer to:

Places
Arcturus, Queensland, a locality in the Central Highlands Region, Australia
Arcturus, Virginia, United States, a neighborhood
 Arcturus, Zimbabwe, a village

Ships
 , various US Navy ships
 Arcturus-class attack cargo ship, a World War II-era class of US Navy ships
 , a Second World War Royal Navy Algerine-class minesweeper
 HSwMS Arcturus (1909), a Royal Swedish Navy 1.-class torpedo boat
 HSwMS Arcturus (T110), a Royal Swedish Navy torpedo boat in service from 1957 to 1981
 HSwMS Arcturus (A503), a Royal Swedish Navy training ship launched in 2008 - see List of Swedish Navy ships: A-B
 Arcturus (steamship), a passenger ship of the Finland Steamship Company
 SS Arcturus, a freighter launched in 1919 and owned by the Union Sulphur Company

In fiction
 Arcturus Mengsk, the leader of the Sons of Korhal and later Emperor of the Terran Dominion in the StarCraft computer game series
 Arcturus, one of the Triangulum invaders in Shin Megami Tensei: Devil Survivor 2

Other uses
 Arcturus Z. Conrad (1855-1937), Christian author, theologian and pastor
 Arcturus (band), a Norwegian avant-garde metal band
 Arcturus (isopod), an isopod genus of the family Arcturidae
 Arcturus, a genus of clams invalidly established by Humphrey in Sowerby, 1839; now Cyclocardia
 Gallery Arcturus, a public art museum in Toronto, Canada
 Arcturus, the name of one of five US Coast Guard General Aviation PJ flying boats
 Arcturus, a variant of the Lockheed CP-140 Aurora maritime patrol aircraft

See also
 Arcturus Formation, a geologic formation in Utah, United States
 Arcturus Group, a geologic group in Nevada, United States
 Arcturus Therapeutics, an American biotech company
 Arcturus T-20, an unmanned aerial vehicle introduced in 2009
 
 
 Arcturian (disambiguation)